Orient Point may refer to:

Orient Point, New South Wales, Australia
Orient Point, New York, United States
Orient Point Light, lighthouse in New York